The seventh edition of the football tournament at the Pan American Games was held in four cities in Mexico: Mexico City (main city of the Games), Guadalajara, Toluca, and Puebla, from October 13 to October 25, 1975. Thirteen teams competed in a round-robin competition, with Argentina defending the title. After the preliminary round there was a second round, followed by a knock-out stage.

Participants
 (Amateur Team)
 (Olympic Team)
 (Amateur Team)
 (Olympic Team)

 (Olympic Team)

 (Olympic Team)
 (Olympic Team)

Preliminary round

Group A

Group B

Group C

Group D

Second round

Group A

Canada did not play the match and withdrew from the tournament. Match awarded to Costa Rica.

Canada had withdrawn from the tournament. Match awarded to Cuba.

Group B

Classification stages (Mexico City)

Bronze medal match

Gold Medal match

Notes

Medalists

Goalscorers

References

1975 Pan American Games
1975
1975
Pan
Pan
Pan